Association Sportive Pélican or AS Pélican for short is a Gabonese football club based in Lambaréné. They play at the Stade Jean Koumou.

Honours
 Coupe du Gabon
Runners-up (1): 2011

External links
  Club profile – soccerway
  Club profile – eurosport.fr

Football clubs in Gabon